Only You (Traditional Chinese: Only You 只有您) is a 2011 Hong Kong television serial drama produced by TVB.

Characters

Chong's family

Mak's family

Ha's family

Only You Wedding Services Company Limited

My Despicable Ex-boyfriend (Episode 3 - 4)

Ex-convict's Wedding (Episode 4 - 6)

Amazing Love (Episode 7 - 9)

I Have a Dream (Episode 11 - 13)

Perfection of Deformity (Episode 14-15)

Her Husband is a Boss (Episode 15 - 17)

A Wealthy Family's Wedding (Episode 20 - 21)

Mom, I'm Getting Married (Episode 22 - 25)

Dreams of the Closing Year (Episode 22 - 30)

My Indian Father-in-law (Episode 25 - 27)

The Last Wedding (Episodes 27–30)

Other characters

See also
Only You

Lists of drama television characters
Lists of Hong Kong television series characters